Charles Henry Godden, CBE (19 November 1922 – 10 June 2020) was a British colonial administrator and diplomat who served as Her Majesty's Commissioner, then Governor of Anguilla, from 1978 to 1983.

Godden was appointed a Commander of the Order of the British Empire in 1981.

References 

British colonial governors and administrators
1922 births
2020 deaths
Commanders of the Order of the British Empire
Members of HM Diplomatic Service
Governors of Anguilla